President of the Republic was the title of the head of state during the Second Spanish Republic (1931–1939). The office was based on the model of the Weimar Republic, then still in power in Germany, and a compromise between the French and American presidential systems.

The "Republican Revolutionary Committee" set up by the Pact of San Sebastián (1930), considered the "central event in the opposition to the monarchy of Alfonso XIII", and headed by Niceto Alcalá-Zamora, eventually became the first provisional government of the Second Republic, with Alcalá-Zamora named President of the Republic on 11 December 1931.

Note that Spain is one of the democracies (see President of the Government for the full list of countries) where the term 'president' must be used with care, as it does not solely refer to the head of state but to several distinct offices: President of the Republic for some historical heads of state; President of the Government for the head of the executive; President of the Senate for the speaker of the upper parliamentary chamber, etcetera. This has led to some confusion in countries where the term president refers solely to the head of state, such as the United States: several incidents involved high-profile American politicians calling the Spanish head of government "President," including George W. Bush in 2001, Jeb Bush in 2003, and most recently, Donald Trump in September 2017. With Spain a constitutional monarchy since 1975, the current monarch is head of state.

First Spanish Republic (1873–74)

Following the abdication of Amadeo I on 10 February 1873, the short-lived First Republic (1873–74) had four heads of state (officially, Presidents of the Executive Power): Estanislao Figueras, Pi i Margall, Nicolás Salmerón, and Emilio Castelar.

Presidents of the Executive Power of the First Republic 

On the eve of the pronunciamiento. (coup d'état) of 3 January 1874, General Pavia sent for Francisco Serrano y Domínguez take to the leadership. Serrano took the title of president of the executive and he continued at the end of December 1874 when the Bourbons were restored by another pronunciamiento.

Second Spanish Republic (1931–1939)
Following the abdication of Alfonso XIII on 14 April 1931, there was no official head of state, meaning that the Prime Minister was, in effect, the highest office in the land. Niceto Alcalá-Zamora assumed the new role of President of the Republic, the effective head of state, after the approval of the new Constitution in December 1931. Manuel Azaña remained as Prime Minister, head of the government, until 12 September 1933.

Presidents (Prime Ministers) of the Provisional Government of the Republic

Presidents of the Republic

With Franco's victory imminent, a National Council of Defense was established to negotiate a peace settlement with the Nationalists. By this point, Franco effectively had military control of the whole country.

Presidents of the National Council of Defense (Republican Zone)

Fall of the Republic
On 27 February 1939, after both France and the United Kingdom had recognised Franco's military victory, President Manuel Azaña, exiled in France, resigned. The following week, the so-called Casado's Coup against Prime Minister Negrín's government led to the creation of the National Defence Council which attempted, unsuccessfully to negotiate terms, with Franco breaking off talks motu proprio. Following Franco's final offensive at the end of March 1939, the Republic fell.

Presidents of the Spanish Republic in exile (1939–1977)

Timeline

See also
List of Spanish monarchs
List of Spanish regents
List of heads of state of Spain

References

Political history of Spain